

Henslow's sparrow (Centronyx henslowii) is a passerine bird in the family Passerellidae. It was named by John James Audubon in honor of John Stevens Henslow. It was originally classified in the genus Emberiza and called Henslow's bunting.

Description
Adults have streaked brown upperparts with a light brown breast with streaks, a white belly and a white throat. They have a pale stripe on the crown with a dark stripe on each side, an olive face and neck, rust-coloured wings and a short dark forked tail.

Measurements:

 Length: 
 Weight: 
 Wingspan:

Distribution and habitat
The range and numbers of this bird are decreasing, probably due to habitat loss of the grasslands that it depends on. However, it has heavily benefited from the Conservation Reserve Program formed by the United States Department of Agriculture, which has helped to stabilize its population. Following this, it was downlisted to Least Concern from Near Threatened in 2018.

The Texas population was solely known from a  brushfield near Houston and disappeared after devegetation due to industrial development in the 1980s. It was considered a distinct subspecies (P. h. houstonensis: Arnold, 1983) but is today considered to fall into the range of variation of the nominate subspecies (Browning, 1990). Likewise, the South Dakotan population formerly known as P. h. occidentalis has been synonymized with the nominate. The only remaining subspecies generally (but not universally) accepted are the eastern Henslow's sparrow and the western Henslow's sparrow, whose ranges are for the most part separated by the Appalachian Mountains.

Diet and behavior

These birds forage on the ground, mainly eating insects (including grasshoppers and beetles), berries, and seeds. Their song is a quick se-lick.

Breeding

Their breeding habitat is shrubby fields, often wet, in southern Canada, the northeastern United States, and the midwestern United States. In 2020, the Central Kentucky Audubon Society discovered that a population of Henslow's sparrows near a winery only needed 5 acres of grassy habitat to successfully breed (previous research had suggested at least 20 to 75 acres were necessary). The nest is a well-concealed open cup on or close to the ground in a grassy location; these birds often nest in small colonies. They migrate to marshes and open pine woods in the southeastern United States.

References

Further reading

Books

 Herkert, J. R., P. D. Vickery, and D. E. Kroodsma. 2002. Henslow's Sparrow (Ammodramus henslowii). In The Birds of North America, No. 672 (A. Poole and F. Gill, eds.). The Birds of North America, Inc., Philadelphia, PA.

Reports

 Austen MJ. (1993). Updated status report on the Henslow's sparrow (Ammodramus Henslowii) in Canada. Canadian Research Index. p. n/a.
 Austen MJ. (1997). National recovery plan for Henslow's sparrow. Canadian Research Index. p. n/a.

Theses

 Bajema RA. PhD (2000). Modeling species distributions: Indiana's terrestrial vertebrate communities with special emphasis on the Henslow's sparrow. Indiana State University, United States, Indiana.
 Giocomo JJ. PhD (2005). Conservation of grassland bird populations on military installations in the eastern United States with special emphasis on Fort Campbell Army Base, Kentucky. The University of Tennessee, United States, Tennessee.
 Guzy MJ. PhD (2005). Habitat use, nesting biology, and within-season movements of grassland birds in southwest Wisconsin. The University of Wisconsin - Madison, United States, Wisconsin.
 Hanson LG. M.S. (1994). The Henslow's Sparrow (Ammodramus henslowii) of Minnesota: Population status and breeding habitat analysis. Central Michigan University, United States, Michigan.
 Harrell WC. PhD (2004). Importance of heterogeneity in a grassland ecosystem. Oklahoma State University, United States, Oklahoma.
 Herkert JR. PhD (1991). An ecological study of the breeding birds of grassland habitats within Illinois. University of Illinois at Urbana-Champaign, United States, Illinois.
 Mazur RL. M.S. (1996). Implications of field management for Henslow's sparrow habitat at Saratoga National Historical Park, New York. State University of New York College of Environmental Science and Forestry, United States, New York.
 McCoy TD. PhD (2000). Effects of landscape composition and multi-scale habitat characteristics on the grassland bird community. University of Missouri - Columbia, United States, Missouri.
 Robins JD. M.A. (1967). ECOLOGY OF HENSLOW'S SPARROW. Western Michigan University, United States, Michigan.
 Tucker JW, Jr. PhD (2002). Influence of season and frequency of fire on Bachman's and Henslow's sparrows in longleaf pine forests of the Gulf Coastal Plain. Auburn University, United States, Alabama.
 Winter M. PhD (1998). Effect of habitat fragmentation on grassland-nesting birds in southwestern Missouri. University of Missouri - Columbia, United States, Missouri.

Articles

 Applegate RD, Flock BE & Horak GJ. (2002). Spring burning and grassland area: Effects on Henslow's sparrow (Ammodramus henslowii (Audubon)) and Dickcissel (Spiza americana (Gmelin)) in Eastern Kansas, USA. Natural Areas Journal. vol 22, no 2. pp. 160–162.
 Arnold KA. (1983). A New Subspecies of Henslow Sparrow Ammodramus-Henslowii. Auk. vol 100, no 2. pp. 504–505.
 Bajema RA & Lima SL. (2001). Landscape-level analyses of Henslow's sparrow (Ammodramus henslowii) abundance in reclaimed coal mine grasslands. American Midland Naturalist. vol 145, no 2. pp. 288–298.
 Carrie NR, Robert OW, Kenneth RM, Jeffrey CS et al. (2002). Winter abundance of and habitat use by Henslow's Sparrows in Louisiana. The Wilson Bulletin. vol 114, no 2. p. 221.
 Catherine LB & Philip CS. (2005). HOME-RANGE SIZE, RESPONSE TO FIRE, AND HABITAT PREFERENCES OF WINTERING HENSLOW'S SPARROWS. The Wilson Bulletin. vol 117, no 3. p. 211.
 Cully JF, Jr. & Michaels HL. (2000). Henslow's Sparrow habitat associations on Kansas tallgrass prairie. Wilson Bulletin. vol 112, no 1. pp. 115–123.
 Eckert KR. (1974). Henslows Sparrow and Bells Vireo in Southwest Minnesota. Loon. vol 46, no 3. pp. 122–123.
 Guzy MJ, Ribic CA & Sample DW. (2002). Helping at a Henslow's Sparrow nest in Wisconsin. Wilson Bulletin. vol 114, no 3. pp. 407–409.
 Herkert JR. (1994). Status and habitat selection of the Henslow's sparrow in Illinois. Wilson Bulletin. vol 106, no 1. pp. 35–45.
 Herkert JR. (1997). Population trends of the Henslow's sparrow in relation to the Conservation Reserve Program in Illinois, 1975–1995. Journal of Field Ornithology. vol 68, no 2. pp. 235–244.
 Kim DH. (2005). First Nebraska nest record for Henslow's sparrow. Prairie Naturalist. vol 37, no 3. pp. 171–173.
 Maiken W. (1999). Nesting biology of Dickcissels and Henslow's sparrows in Southwestern Missouri prairie fragments. The Wilson Bulletin. vol 111, no 4. p. 515.
 Mangun JC & Kolb RL. (2000). Effects of grassland management on Henslow's sparrow, Ammodramus henslowii, (Fringillidae), populations in eastern North Carolina. Journal of the Elisha Mitchell Scientific Society. vol 116, no 1. pp. 49–56.
 McNair DB. (1998). Henslow's sparrow and sedge wren response to a dormant-season prescribed burn in a pine savanna. Florida Field Naturalist. vol 26, no 2. pp. 46–47.
 Patterson DE. (1968). Henslows Sparrow in Hardin County Tennessee USA Passerherbulus-Henslowii Behavior. Migrant. vol 39, no 3. pp. 61–62.
 Pranty B & Scheuerell MD. (1997). First summer record of the Henslow's sparrow in Florida. Florida Field Naturalist. vol 25, no 2. pp. 64–66.
 Reid W. (1992). Henslow's sparrow Ammodramus henslowii. Brauning, D. vol W, p. Atlas of breeding birds in Pennsylvania.
 Reinking DL, Wiedenfeld DA, Wolfe DH & Rohrbaugh RW, Jr. (2000). Distribution, habitat use, and nesting success of Henslow's sparrow in Oklahoma. Prairie Naturalist. vol 32, no 4. pp. 219–232.
 Robb AB, Travis LD, Peter ES & Steven LL. (2001). Reclaimed coal mine grasslands and their significance for Henslow's sparrows in the American midwest. The Auk. vol 118, no 2. p. 422.
 Robins JD. (1971). A Study of Henslows Sparrow in Michigan. Wilson Bulletin. vol 83, no 1. pp. 39–48.
 Shaffer JA, Igl LD & Vanhove F. (2003). Historical and recent records and first nest records of Henslow's sparrow in North Dakota. Prairie Naturalist. vol 35, no 2. pp. 81–94.
 Sheldon P, Nicholas RH & Geoffrey EH. (1999). Habitat requirements of Henslow's Sparrows wintering in silvicultural lands of the Gulf Coastal Plain. The Auk. vol 116, no 1. p. 109.
 Thatcher BS, Krementz DG & Woodrey MS. (2006). Henslow's sparrow winter-survival estimates and response to prescribed burning. Journal of Wildlife Management. vol 70, no 1. pp. 198–206.
 Tucker JW & Robinson WD. (2003). Influence of season and frequency of fire on Henslow's Sparrows (Ammodramus henslowii) wintering on Gulf Coast pitcher plant bogs. Auk. vol 120, no 1. pp. 96–106.
 Zimmerman JL. (1988). Breeding Season Habitat Selection by the Henslow's Sparrow Ammodramus-Henslowii in Kansas USA. Wilson Bulletin. vol 100, no 1. pp. 17–24.

External links
Henslow's sparrow species account - Cornell Lab of Ornithology
Henslow's sparrow - Ammodramus henslowii - USGS Patuxent Bird Identification InfoCenter
Henslow's sparrow photo gallery VIREO

Henslow's sparrow
Native birds of the Northeastern United States
Native birds of the Plains-Midwest (United States)
Henslow's sparrow
Henslow's sparrow
Taxobox binomials not recognized by IUCN